Agha Saadat Ali (21 June 1929 in Lahore, Punjab – 25 October 1995 in Lahore) was a Pakistani cricketer who played in one Test in 1955. He also stood as an umpire in one ODI game in 1978.

Agha Saadat Ali appeared in non-first-class matches against the touring West Indians in 1948 and a Commonwealth team in 1949. Between 1949-50, when he made his first-class debut for Pakistan Universities against Ceylon, and 1961-62 when he captained Lahore B, he played 17 first-class matches altogether. He had limited success as a batsman, but was regarded as one of the best fielders in Pakistan.

After retirement he became a coach at the national level, and served as assistant secretary of the BCCP. He was also as president of the Billiard and Snooker
Association of Lahore.

Both of his sons played first-class cricket. He died from carcinomatosis aged 66.

See also
 List of One Day International cricket umpires

References

1929 births
1995 deaths
Pakistan Test cricketers
Pakistani cricketers
Bahawalpur cricketers
Pakistan Universities cricketers
North Zone (Pakistan) cricketers
Punjab (Pakistan) cricketers
Lahore cricketers
Pakistani One Day International cricket umpires
Cricketers from Lahore